Sulphur Well is an unincorporated community located in Metcalfe County, Kentucky, United States.

History
Sulphur Well is named for a vein of mineral water a local landowner discovered while drilling for salt before the American Civil War.  The landowner then began operating a hotel near the mineral well, and a village grew up in the area. By 1878, the community had a school, and a post office was established on July 30, 1879. In 1883, the community was reported to have a population of 100, with several stores, a hotel, and a flour mill.

Geography
The community is located in northern Metcalfe County along Kentucky Route 70.

References

Unincorporated communities in Metcalfe County, Kentucky